Dardel may refer to:

 Fritz von Dardel (1817-1901), Swedish illustrator and early comics artist
 Guy von Dardel (1919-2009), Swedish physicist
 Jean Dardel (14th century), French Franciscan, chronicler of Armenia, adviser and confessor to the king of Armenia
 Nils Dardel (1888-1943), Swedish Post-Impressionist painter
 Nina Viveka Maria von Dardel (1921-2019), Swedish businesswoman, half-sister of Raoul Wallenberg
 Därdel, a card game also known as Tatteln or Tartli

See also
 Maya Dardel, a 2017 US-Polish drama film